Eudokia Laskarina Angelina (born between 1210 and 1212, died after 1247) was a Byzantine princess. She was a younger daughter of Emperor Theodore I Laskaris of Nicaea, and Anna Komnene Angelina.

She was engaged to Robert I, Latin Emperor (1221), but the marriage was blocked by the Patriarch of Constantinople. She married firstly and divorced Frederick II, Duke of Austria, secondly (before 1230) Anseau de Cayeux, later regent of the Latin Empire (1237-1238).

In 1247, her husband Anseau de Cayeux assigned to her custody over the city of Tzurulon in hope that it will not be attacked by John III Doukas Vatatzes, who was married to Eudokia′s sister Irene Laskarina.

Her name was Eudokia, but in one western source, related to her Austrian marriage, she is mentioned as Sophia.

References

Sources

External links 
 Eudoxia de Cayeux

People of the Empire of Nicaea
1210s births
13th-century deaths
13th-century Byzantine women
13th-century Austrian women